In particle physics, particle decay is the spontaneous process of one unstable subatomic particle transforming into multiple other particles. The particles created in this process (the final state) must each be less massive than the original, although the total invariant mass of the system must be conserved. A particle is unstable if there is at least one allowed final state that it can decay into. Unstable particles will often have multiple ways of decaying, each with its own associated probability. Decays are mediated by one or several fundamental forces. The particles in the final state may themselves be unstable and subject to further decay.

The term is typically distinct from radioactive decay, in which an unstable atomic nucleus is transformed into a lighter nucleus accompanied by the emission of particles or radiation, although the two are conceptually similar and are often described using the same terminology.

Probability of survival and particle lifetime
Particle decay is a Poisson process, and hence the probability that a particle survives for time t before decaying is given by an exponential distribution whose time constant depends on the particle's velocity:

where

 is the mean lifetime of the particle (when at rest), and
 is the Lorentz factor of the particle.

Table of some elementary and composite particle lifetimes
All data is from the Particle Data Group.

{| class=wikitable style="text-align: center;"
!Type
!Name
!Symbol
!Mass (MeV)
!Mean lifetime
|-
|rowspan="3" | Lepton
|Electron / Positron
|
|0.511
|
|- 
|Muon / Antimuon
|
|105.7
|
|-
|Tau lepton / Antitau
|
|1777
|
|-
|rowspan="2" | Meson
|Neutral Pion
|
|135
|
|-
|Charged Pion
|
|139.6
|
|-
|rowspan="2" | Baryon
|Proton / Antiproton
|
|938.2
|
|-
|Neutron / Antineutron
|
|939.6
|
|-
|rowspan="2" | Boson
|W boson
|
|80400
|
|-
|Z boson
|
|91000
|
|}

Decay rate
This section uses natural units, where 

The lifetime of a particle is given by the inverse of its decay rate, the probability per unit time that the particle will decay. For a particle of a mass M and four-momentum P decaying into particles with momenta , the differential decay rate is given by the general formula (expressing Fermi's golden rule)

where
n is the number of particles created by the decay of the original,
S is a combinatorial factor to account for indistinguishable final states (see below),
 is the invariant matrix element or amplitude connecting the initial state to the final state (usually calculated using Feynman diagrams),
 is an element of the phase space, and
 is the four-momentum of particle i.

The factor S is given by

where
m is the number of sets of indistinguishable particles in the final state, and
 is the number of particles of type j, so that .

The phase space can be determined from

where
 is a four-dimensional Dirac delta function,
 is the (three-)momentum of particle i, and
 is the energy of particle i.
One may integrate over the phase space to obtain the total decay rate for the specified final state.

If a particle has multiple decay branches or modes with different final states, its full decay rate is obtained by summing the decay rates for all branches. The branching ratio for each mode is given by its decay rate divided by the full decay rate.

Two-body decay
This section uses natural units, where

Decay rate
Say a parent particle of mass M decays into two particles, labeled 1 and 2.  In the rest frame of the parent particle,

which is obtained by requiring that four-momentum be conserved in the decay, i.e. 

Also, in spherical coordinates,

From two different frames
The angle of an emitted particle in the lab frame is related to the angle it has emitted in the center of momentum frame by the equation

Complex mass and decay rate

This section uses natural units, where 

The mass of an unstable particle is formally a complex number, with the real part being its mass in the usual sense, and the imaginary part being its decay rate in natural units. When the imaginary part is large compared to the real part, the particle is usually thought of as a resonance more than a particle. This is because in quantum field theory a particle of mass M (a real number) is often exchanged between two other particles when there is not enough energy to create it, if the time to travel between these other particles is short enough, of order 1/M, according to the uncertainty principle. If  then the particle usually decays before it completes its travel.

See also
Relativistic Breit-Wigner distribution
Particle physics
Particle radiation
List of particles
Weak interaction

Notes

External links
 (See page 2).
Particle Data Group.
"The Particle Adventure" Particle Data Group, Lawrence Berkeley National Laboratory.

Particle physics